Veselíčko is a municipality and village in Písek District in the South Bohemian Region of the Czech Republic. It has about 200 inhabitants.

Administrative parts
The village of Bilina is an administrative part of Veselíčko.

Gallery

References

Villages in Písek District